Mnuphorus is a genus of beetles in the family Carabidae, containing the following species:

 Mnuphorus albomaculatus Ballion, 1871
 Mnuphorus baeckmanni Semenov, 1926
 Mnuphorus callistoides Reitter, 1889
 Mnuphorus cyrtus Glasunov, 1913
 Mnuphorus iliensis Glasunov, 1913
 Mnuphorus jakowlewi Semenov, 1891
 Mnuphorus sellatus Gebler, 1843
 Mnuphorus semenovi Glasunov, 1913
 Mnuphorus tetraspilus Solsky, 1874

References

Lebiinae